Federal Highways and Federal Routes can be found in:

Australia: Federal Highway 
Brazil: Brazilian Federal Highway and Brazilian Highway System 
Germany: Bundesstraßen
Malaysia: Federal Highway and Malaysian Federal Roads System
Mexico: Mexican Federal Highway
Russia: Russian federal highways
United States: United States Numbered Highways
 In Florida, parts of U.S. Route 1 have the name Federal Highway.